Palamedes was a Euboean prince, son of King Nauplius in Greek mythology. He joined the rest of the Greeks in the expedition against Troy. He was also credited with the invention of dice, mathematics, and writing.

Family 
Palamedes's mother was either Clymene (daughter of King Catreus of Crete), Hesione, or Philyra. He was the brother of Oeax and Nausimedon.

Mythology 
 
Although he is a major character in some accounts of the Trojan War, Palamedes is not mentioned in Homer's Iliad.

After Paris took Helen to Troy, Agamemnon sent Palamedes to Ithaca to retrieve Odysseus, who had promised to defend the marriage of Helen and Menelaus. Odysseus did not want to honor his oath, so he plowed his fields with a donkey and an ox both hitched to the same plow, so the beasts of different sizes caused the plow to pull chaotically. Palamedes guessed what was happening and put Odysseus' son, Telemachus, in front of the plow. Odysseus stopped working and revealed his sanity.

The ancient sources show differences in regards to the details of how Palamedes met his death. Odysseus never forgave Palamedes for ruining his attempt to stay out of the Trojan War. When Palamedes advised the Greeks to return home, Odysseus hid gold in his tent and wrote a fake letter purportedly from Priam. The letter was found and the Greeks accused him of being a traitor. Palamedes was stoned to death by the Greek army. According to other accounts, Odysseus and Diomedes drowned him during a fishing expedition. Still another version relates that he was lured into a well in search of treasure, and then was crushed by stones.

In ancient literature
Ovid discusses Palamedes' role in the Trojan War in the Metamorphoses. Palamedes' fate is described in Virgil's Aeneid. In the Apology, Plato describes Socrates as looking forward to speaking with Palamedes after death, and intimates in the Phaedrus that Palamedes authored a work on rhetoric. Euripides and many other dramatists have written dramas about his fate. The orator Gorgias also wrote a Defense of Palamedes, describing the defense speech that Palamedes gave when charged with treason.

Dares the Phrygian, Palamedes was illustrated as ". . .tall and slender, wise, magnanimous, and charming."

Pausanias in his Description of Greece (2.20.3) says that in Corinth there is a Temple of Fortune to which Palamedes dedicated the dice that he had invented; Plato in The Republic (Book 7) remarks (through the character of Socrates) that Palamedes claimed to have invented numbers. Hyginus claims Palamedes created eleven letters of the Greek alphabet:

Reception

Vondel play

The major Dutch playwright Joost van den Vondel wrote in 1625 the play Palamedes, based on the Greek myth. The play had a clear topical political connotation: the unjust killing of Palamedes stands for the execution of the statesman Johan van Oldenbarnevelt six years earlier—which Vondel, like others in the Dutch Republic, considered a judicial murder. In Vondel's version, responsibility for Palamedes' killing is attributed mainly to Agamemnon; the play's harsh and tyrannical Agamemnon was clearly intended to portray Prince Maurits of Nassau. Authorities in Amsterdam found no difficulty in deciphering the political meanings behind Vondel's Classical allusions and imposed a heavy fine on the playwright.

20th century
In one modern account, The Luck of Troy by Roger Lancelyn Green, Palamedes was double-dealing with the Trojans. In Madeline Miller's novel Circe, Odysseus tells Circe that while on night watch Palamedes fell into a pit with sharpened stakes at the bottom, implying that this was his revenge for Palamedes' role in recruiting him for the Trojan War.

Notes

References 
 Apollodorus, The Library with an English Translation by Sir James George Frazer, F.B.A., F.R.S. in 2 Volumes, Cambridge, MA, Harvard University Press; London, William Heinemann Ltd. 1921. ISBN 0-674-99135-4. Online version at the Perseus Digital Library. Greek text available from the same website.
Dictys Cretensis, from The Trojan War. The Chronicles of Dictys of Crete and Dares the Phrygian translated by Richard McIlwaine Frazer, Jr. (1931-). Indiana University Press. 1966. Online version at the Topos Text Project.
D. R. Reinsch, "Die Palamedes-Episode in der Synopsis Chronike des Konstantinos Manasses und ihre Inspirationsquelle," in Byzantinische Sprachkunst. Studien zur byzantinischen Literatur gewidmet Wolfram Hoerandner zum 65. Geburtstag. Hg. v. Martin Hinterberger und Elisabeth Schiffer. Berlin-New York, Walter de Gruyter, 2007 (Byzantinisches Archiv, 20), 266–276.
Gaius Julius Hyginus, Fabulae from The Myths of Hyginus translated and edited by Mary Grant. University of Kansas Publications in Humanistic Studies. Online version at the Topos Text Project.
Gantz, Timothy, Early Greek Myth: A Guide to Literary and Artistic Sources, Johns Hopkins University Press, 1996, Two volumes:  (Vol. 1),  (Vol. 2).
Hard, Robin, The Routledge Handbook of Greek Mythology: Based on H.J. Rose's "Handbook of Greek Mythology", Psychology Press, 2004, . Google Books.
Pausanias, Description of Greece with an English Translation by W.H.S. Jones, Litt.D., and H.A. Ormerod, M.A., in 4 Volumes. Cambridge, MA, Harvard University Press; London, William Heinemann Ltd. 1918. . Online version at the Perseus Digital Library
Pausanias, Graeciae Descriptio. 3 vols. Leipzig, Teubner. 1903. Greek text available at the Perseus Digital Library.
Publius Ovidius Naso, Metamorphoses translated by Brookes More (1859-1942). Boston, Cornhill Publishing Co. 1922. Online version at the Perseus Digital Library.
Publius Ovidius Naso, Metamorphoses. Hugo Magnus. Gotha (Germany). Friedr. Andr. Perthes. 1892. Latin text available at the Perseus Digital Library.
Publius Vergilius Maro, Aeneid. Theodore C. Williams. trans. Boston. Houghton Mifflin Co. 1910. Online version at the Perseus Digital Library.
Publius Vergilius Maro, Bucolics, Aeneid, and Georgics. J. B. Greenough. Boston. Ginn & Co. 1900. Latin text available at the Perseus Digital Library.

External links

Palamedes at Greek Mythology Link

Achaean Leaders
Characters in Greek mythology
Greek mythological heroes
People executed by stoning